Paine House may refer to the following places:
Paine House (Coventry, Rhode Island), listed on the National Register of Historic Places
Paine House (Xenia, Illinois), listed on the National Register of Historic Places
Samuel and Mercy Paine House, listed on the National Register of Historic Places
Paine House (Irving, Texas), listed on the National Register of Historic Places in Dallas County, Texas
Paine-Dodge House, listed on the National Register of Historic Places, located on Greenwood Farm (Ipswich, Massachusetts)